The 1892 Marquette Blue and Gold football team was an American football team that represented Marquette University as an independent during the 1892 college football season. In Marquette's first season of American football, the University compiled a 1–2 record, with two losses against nearby Milwaukee High School and a win over Loyola of Chicago.

Schedule

References

Marquette
Marquette Golden Avalanche football seasons
Marquette Blue and Gold football